IgSF CAMs (Immunoglobulin-like Cell Adhesion Molecules) are cell adhesion molecules that belong to Immunoglobulin superfamily. It is regarded as the most diverse superfamily of CAMs. This family is characterized by their extracellular domains containing Ig-like domains. The Ig domains are then followed by Fibronectin type III domain repeats and IgSFs are anchored to the membrane by a GPI moiety. This family is involved in both homophilic or heterophilic binding and has the ability to bind integrins or different IgSF CAMs.

Examples

Here is a list of some molecules of this family:

NCAMs Neural Cell Adhesion Molecules
ICAM-1 Intercellular Cell Adhesion Molecule
VCAM-1 Vascular Cell Adhesion Molecule
PECAM-1 Platelet-endothelial Cell Adhesion Molecule
MAdCAM-1 Mucosal Vascular Addressin Cell Adhesion Molecule
L1 family including L1 (protein), CHL1, Neurofascin and NrCAM
SIGLEC family including Myelin-associated glycoprotein (MAG, SIGLEC-4), CD22 and CD83
CTX family including CTX, Junctional adhesion molecule (JAM), BT-IgSF, Coxsackie virus and adenovirus receptor (CAR), VSIG, ESAM
Nectins and related proteins, including CADM1 and other Synaptic Cell Adhesion Molecules
CD2
CD48
HEPACAM
HEPACAM2
DSCAM - Down syndrome cell adhesion molecule

References

Cell adhesion molecules